Fahim Burney is a Pakistani television director and producer. Mostly known for his work in Urdu television industry, he has directed many directed and produced several television series. His debut film Pyar Hi Pyar Mein (2003) earned him Lux Style Award nomination of Best film director. He also got the Best TV director for Kabhi Aye Naa Judai (2007).

Filmography

Film

Television

External links 

https://minutemirror.com.pk/director-fahim-burney-continues-with-his-lovely-routine-of-sharing-friday-special-photos-5122/

References 

Living people
Pakistani television directors
Pakistani television producers
Year of birth missing (living people)